Gownjuk-e Olya (also Romanized as Gownjūk-e ‘Olyā; also known as Gavanjūk-e Bālā) is a village in Piveh Zhan Rural District, Ahmadabad District, Mashhad County, Razavi Khorasan Province, Iran. At the 2006 census, its population was 586, in 147 families.

References 

Populated places in Mashhad County